Amyntas Nicator (epithet means "the Conqueror") was an Indo-Greek king. His coins have been found both in eastern Punjab and Afghanistan, indicating that he ruled a considerable territory.

Date
Bopearachchi places Amyntas c. 95–90 BCE, whereas Senior places him c. 80–65 BCE.

Coinage
Amyntas struck bilingual silver coins with a variety of portraits. Most of these bear the reverse of sitting Zeus holding a victory palm and a small statue of Athena, which according to RC Senior may have indicated an alliance between the house of Menander I and the house of Antialcidas. Some of his coins feature the reverse of fighting Athena typical for Menander's descendants. The epithet Nikator (Victor) was previously only used on the Bactrian coins of Agathocles, a century before Amyntas' reign.

His bronzes feature the syncretic deity Zeus-Mithra wearing a phrygian cap and Athena standing at rest, both forming the vitarka mudra.

Amyntas also minted some spectacular Attic coins, the largest silver coins of Antiquity: double-decadrachms, of a weight of 85g. These huge coins were found on the archeological site of Qunduz in Afghanistan.
Some of these coins use his ordinary Zeus reverse, but some of them used Tyche in an identical position.

Overstrikes
Amyntas is known to have overstruck coins of Heliokles II.

See also
 Greco-Bactrian Kingdom
 Greco-Buddhism
 Indo-Scythians
 Indo-Parthian Kingdom
 Kushan Empire

References

Further reading

External links
 Coins of Amyntas

Indo-Greek kings
1st-century BC rulers in Asia
Euthydemid dynasty